Eat Already? is a Singaporean Hokkien-language drama series which is telecast on Singapore's free-to-air channel, Mediacorp Channel 8. It stars Li Yinzhu, Elvin Ng, Marcus Chin, Aileen Tan, Wang Lei, Aden Tan and He Yingying of the series with special appearances by Chee Hong Tat and Low Yen Ling.

It is primarily targeted at Singaporean elderly as most of them speak non-Mandarin Chinese languages at home. It gives them various tips for healthy living and aging. While most of the characters speak Hokkien, Teochew was used by Chen Liping and Zoe Tay in several episodes.

Plot 
The series is set in a coffee shop and it focuses on an elderly widow, Ah Niu Sao (Li Yinzhu), who works as a dishwasher and cleaner in a coffee shop in order to support her two sons. They are Ah Bee (Elvin Ng), who is formerly a gambler and currently a chef, and Ah Kiong (Aden Tan), who is a disabled person. As the series progresses, she faces many kinds of difficulties in life but manages to pull through due to the help from her neighbours and various healthcare support schemes.

Cast

Main cast

Cameo appearance

Episodes

Reception 
Despite being intended for an elderly audience, the show has gained some popularity among Singaporeans of other age groups. Eat Already became the second Channel 8 series known to have Cabinet Ministers make cameo appearances. Low Yen Ling had introduced the courses offered by the Lifelong Learning Institute in her capacity as then-Parliamentary Secretary for Education (now Minister of State for Trade and Industry and Culture, Community and Youth), while Chee Hong Tat engaged senior citizens in his Bishan-Toa Payoh GRC in his capacity as Minister of State for Communications and Information (now Minister of State for Transport and Foreign Affairs). The series received positive acclaim with 250,000 viewers on average, and has garnered over 1.6 million online views on Youtube.

Awards & Nominations

Star Awards 2017
Eat Already?  was nominated for one category. The other drama serials that are nominated for Best Theme Song are You Can Be an Angel 2, The Dream Job, Life - Fear Not & If Only I Could (TV series). It did not win a single nomination.

References 

2016 Singaporean television series debuts
2016 Singaporean television series endings
Hokkien-language television shows
2016 Singaporean television seasons
Channel 8 (Singapore) original programming